The Dwarves Must Die is the 2004 release by the American punk band Dwarves.  It is the band's first release on the Sympathy for the Record Industry label.  There are several cameos, including Dexter Holland from The Offspring, Nash Kato from Urge Overkill, desert rock icon Nick Oliveri, Josh Freese from The Vandals, Spike Slawson from Me First and the Gimme Gimmes, gangster rapper San Quinn, DJ Marz, and even the original Space Ghost himself, Gary Owens.  The rather freeform departure from the standard thrash/punk/noise sound is obvious in this release, slightly more so than in previous Dwarves productions, perhaps because they have been producing music for almost 20 years;  however the original sound of the Dwarves shows clearly in several tracks.

The title track appears on the soundtrack for the 2009 comedy film Observe and Report.

Track listing

Personnel
Guitar: He Who Cannot Be Named
Engineer: Bradley Cook
Engineer: Trevor Whatever
Bass: Tony Lombardo
Vocals: Blag Dahlia
Bass/Vocals: Rex Everything
Engineer: Eric Valentine

References

Dwarves (band) albums
2004 albums